Eduardo da Silva Nascimento Neto (born 24 October 1988 in Salvador, Bahia), known as Eduardo Neto, is a Brazilian professional footballer who plays for Tombense as a central defender or a defensive midfielder.

Club career
The Brazilian central defender left on 21 June 2010 his club Villa Rio and signed with Portuguese club Braga.

On 13 January 2011, Eduardo Neto joined Vitória on loan until the end of the season.

On 29 June 2018, Nagoya Grampus announced the signing of Neto. On 12 February 2020, Neto was released by Nagoya Grampus.

Career statistics

Club

Honours
Botafogo
Taça Rio: 2008
Taca Guanabara: 2009
Kawasaki Frontale
 J1 League: 2017

References

External links

Profile at Kawasaki Frontale
 CBF
sambafoot
 ogol.com.br

1988 births
Living people
Brazilian footballers
Botafogo de Futebol e Regatas players
Esporte Clube Bahia players
Esporte Clube Vitória players
ABC Futebol Clube players
Avaí FC players
Kawasaki Frontale players
Nagoya Grampus players
SC Tavriya Simferopol players
Ukrainian Premier League players
J1 League players
Brazilian expatriate footballers
Expatriate footballers in Ukraine
Expatriate footballers in Japan
Brazilian expatriate sportspeople in Ukraine
Association football defenders
Sportspeople from Salvador, Bahia